Examples of a call to prayer may be:

 Adhan, the Muslim call to prayer
 Barechu, the Jewish call to prayer
 Church bells, the call to Christian prayer